The MTV Video Music Awards Japan 2003 were hosted by hip hop artist Zeebra and pop singer and actress Nana Katase

Awards 
Winners are in bold text.

Source

Video of the Year 
Rip Slyme — "Rakuen Baby"
 Eminem — "Without Me"
 Avril Lavigne — "Complicated"
 Mr. Children — "Hero"
 Hikaru Utada — "Sakura Drops"

Album of the Year 
Chemistry — Second to None
 Eminem — The Eminem Show
 Avril Lavigne — Let Go
 Rip Slyme — Tokyo Classic
 Hikaru Utada — Deep River

Best Male Video 
Craig David — "What's Your Flava?"
 Eminem — "Without Me"
 Ken Hirai — "Ring"
 Tamio Okuda  — "Man wo Jishite"
 Justin Timberlake — "Like I Love You"

Best Female Video 
Hikaru Utada — "Sakura Drops"
 Avril Lavigne — "Complicated"
 Jennifer Lopez featuring Styles P and Jadakiss — "Jenny from the Block"
 Misia — "Back Blocks"
 Ringo Shiina — "Kuki (Stem)"

Best Group Video 
Rip Slyme — "Rakuen Baby"
 Blue — "One Love"
 Bon Jovi — "Everyday"
 Mr. Children — "Hero"
 Oasis — "Little By Little"

Best New Artist 
Avril Lavigne — "Complicated"
 Ashanti — "Foolish"
 Minmi — "The Perfect Vision"
 t.A.T.u. — "All The Things She Said"
 The Music — "The People"

Best Rock Video 
Red Hot Chili Peppers — "By the Way"
 Coldplay — "In My Place"
 Dragon Ash — "Fantasista"
 Foo Fighters — "All My Life"
 Sum 41 — "Still Waiting"

Best Pop Video 
Blue — "One Love"
 BoA — "Valenti"
 Ayumi Hamasaki — "Real Me"
 Mr. Children — "Hero"
 Justin Timberlake — "Like I Love You"

Best R&B Video 
Crystal Kay — "Girl U Love"
 Ashanti — "Foolish"
 Chemistry — "My Gift to You"
 Craig David — "What's Your Flava?"
 TLC — "Girl Talk"

Best Hip-Hop Video 
Rip Slyme — "Funkastic"
 Eminem — "Without Me"
 Missy Elliott — "Work It"
 King Giddra — "F.F.B."
 Nelly — "Hot in Herre"

Best Dance Video 
Supercar — "Yumegiwa Last Boy"
 Kylie Minogue — "Come Into My World"
 Moby — "We Are All Made of Stars"
 Sketch Show — "Turn Turn"
 Underworld — "Two Months Off"

Best Video from a Film 
Eminem — "Lose Yourself" (from 8 Mile)
 Beyoncé — "Work It Out" (from Austin Powers in Goldmember)
 King Giddra — "Generation Next" (from Madness in Bloom)
 Madonna — "Die Another Day" (from 007 Die Another Day)
 Supercar — "Yumegiwa Last Boy" (from Ping Pong)

Best Collaboration 
Suite Chic featuring Firstklas — "Good Life"
 Eve featuring Alicia Keys — "Gangsta Lovin'"
 Crystal Kay featuring Sphere of Influence and Sora — "Hard to Say"
 Nelly featuring Kelly Rowland — "Dilemma"
 Rhymester featuring Crazy Ken Band — "Nikutai Kankei part 2"

Best Live Performance 
Kick The Can Crew
 Craig David
 Exile
 Eve
 Suite Chic

Special award

Legend Award 
Run DMC

Live performances 
 175R
 Blue
 Chemistry
 Craig David
 Eve
 Crystal Kay
 M-Flo
 Rip Slyme
 Run DMC
 Sketch Show

References

2003 in Japanese music